Arthur Emilius David Anderson,  (30 September 1886 – 21 October 1967) was a British Army officer and an English track and field athlete from Brentford, who competed in the 1912 Summer Olympics.

Early life and Olympian
Anderson was born in Twickenham, a village and a parish in Brentford district, Middlesex county in Greater London, England. His parents were David Anderson (b. 1844), an Anglican prebendary, and Blanch Alice May Anderson (b. 1857). He also had a sister, Mona Constance Anabel (b. 1884), and a brother, Gerrard Rupert Laurie (b. 1889)

In 1912, Anderson was eliminated in the semi-finals of the 100 metres competition as well as of the 200 metres event.

Anderson's brother Gerard held the world record in the 440 metres hurdles and also participated in the 1912 Stockholm Olympics. In 1914, Gerard Anderson was killed in combat in the First World War.

Military service
During the First World War, Anderson served with the King's Own Scottish Borderers. He was awarded the Military Cross in the 1916 Birthday Honours and the Distinguished Service Order in the 1918 New Year Honours.

References

External links
Profile at British Olympic Committee

1886 births
1967 deaths
Companions of the Distinguished Service Order
Recipients of the Military Cross
English male sprinters
Olympic athletes of Great Britain
Athletes (track and field) at the 1912 Summer Olympics
Sportspeople from Twickenham